Ernst Johann Pröckl (21 June 1888 – 26 November 1957) was an Austrian stage actor and director. He also appeared in numerous films, mainly German.

Selected filmography
 The Peruvian (1919)
 Judith Trachtenberg (1920)
 Christian Wahnschaffe (1920)
 The Last Hour (1921)
 The Story of a Maid (1921)
 Bigamy (1922)
 Youth (1922)
 Vineta, the Sunken City (1923)
 Princess Suwarin (1923)
 The Treasure of Gesine Jacobsen (1923)
 The Beautiful Girl (1923)
 Leap Into Life (1924)
 I Love You (1925)
 The Proud Silence (1925)
 People of the Sea (1925)
 The Sweet Girl (1926)
 I Stand in the Dark Midnight (1927)
 The Schorrsiegel Affair (1928)
 Fair Game (1928)
 The Model from Montparnasse (1929)
 Marriage in Name Only (1930)
 The Stolen Face (1930)
 Moritz Makes His Fortune (1931)
 The Battle of Bademunde (1931)
 That's All That Matters (1931)
 The Scoundrel (1931)
 The White Demon (1932)
 Modern Dowry (1932)
 Death Over Shanghai (1932)
 Tannenberg (1932)
 Madame Makes Her Exit (1932)
 Once There Was a Waltz (1932)
 The Emperor's Waltz (1933)
 Grand Duchess Alexandra (1933)
 A Door Opens (1933)
 Romance (1936)
 Shadows of the Past (1936)
 Hannerl and Her Lovers (1936)
 Darling of the Sailors (1937)
 Frau Sixta (1938)
 Hotel Sacher (1939)
 The Heart Must Be Silent (1944)
 Lavender (1953)
 Forest Liesel (1956)

References

Bibliography 
 Hardt, Ursula. From Caligari to California: Erich Pommer's life in the International Film Wars. Berghahn Books, 1996.

External links 
 

1888 births
1957 deaths
Austrian male stage actors
Austrian male film actors
Austrian male silent film actors
Austrian film directors
20th-century Austrian male actors
Male actors from Vienna